William Edgar "Frog" Metzger, Jr. (August 21, 1890 – December 2, 1951) was a college football player.

Vanderbilt
Metzger was a prominent guard for the Vanderbilt Commodores of Vanderbilt University from 1908 to 1911. Metzger was Dan McGugin's first great lineman.  Metzger was selected for an Associated Press Southeast Area All-Time football team 1869-1919 era. Metzger was chosen for an all-time Vandy team in 1912, as well as an All-time Vandy team published in Vanderbilt's yearbook in 1934. At Vanderbilt he was a member of the Kappa Alpha fraternity.

1909
Metzger was injured in the loss to Ohio State in 1909, breaking his leg just above the knee.

1910
The 1910 team which tied defending national champion Yale and allowed just 8 points and scored 165 was led by Metzger, a unanimous All-Southern player and third-team All-American as chosen by Walter Camp. He was the third ever player from the South to get on one of Camp's teams.

References

Vanderbilt Commodores football players
American football guards
All-Southern college football players
1890 births
1951 deaths
Players of American football from Nashville, Tennessee
American football fullbacks